The 2014–15 USC Trojans women's basketball team represented University of Southern California during the 2014–15 NCAA Division I women's basketball season. The Trojans, led by second year head coach Cynthia Cooper-Dyke, played their home games at the Galen Center as members of the Pac-12 Conference. They finished the season 15–15, 7–11 in Pac-12 play to finish in a tie for seventh place. They lost in the first round of the Pac-12 women's basketball tournament to Colorado.

Roster

Schedule

|-
!colspan=9 style="background:#990000; color:#FFCC00;"| Exhibition

|-
!colspan=9 style="background:#990000; color:#FFCC00;"| Regular Season

|-
!colspan=9 style="background:#990000;"| 2015 Pac-12 Conference Women's Tournament

See also
 2014–15 USC Trojans men's basketball team

References

USC Trojans women's basketball seasons
USC Trojans
USC Trojans
USC TROJ